Mekedonia Humanitarian Association, known simply as Mekedonia, is an Ethiopian non-governmental, non-profit independent humanitarian organization founded in January 2010 by Benyam Belete. It is the sole independent organization in Ethiopia that funds and supports critically disabled and mentally ill people as well as elderly people with provisions of housing, clothing, food and counseling.

Overview
Mekedonia Humanitarian Association was founded on 7 January 2010 by Benyam Belete supporting elderly and mentally ill people. The organization supports them with housing, clothing, food, counseling, information and other necessities to elderly and disabled people. In this pursuit, MHU focuses on the most vulnerable people whose disabilities meet their priority social agendas and supports them with varied approaches and strategies. The organization is an Ethiopian Resident Charity under the legal supervision of the Ethiopian Federal Government Charities and Societies Agency and headquartered in Addis Ababa, Ethiopia in Ayat Condominium. The beneficiary residents are homeless people picked from different parts of the country.

References

2010 establishments in Ethiopia
Organisations based in Ethiopia